Granville Mall is an area in downtown Halifax, Nova Scotia, Canada. It was formerly part of Granville Street, until nearby developments, such as the Cogswell Interchange, and Scotia Square, rendered this section fairly useless traffic-wise and it was converted into a pedestrian mall. The buildings lining the street house a large variety of pubs and stores, and also part of the Nova Scotia College of Art and Design (NSCAD University). The mall has also been used for several films, mainly as stand-ins for larger and more expensive cities to film in.

Buildings and structures in Halifax, Nova Scotia
Pedestrian malls in Canada